Kevin Leonel Sibille (born 15 September 1998) is an Argentine professional footballer who plays as a centre-back for Spanish club CD Atlético Baleares.

Career
Sibille started off his career with River Plate. He was an unused substitute three times between 2015 and 2017, eventually making his first professional appearance during the 2017–18 Argentine Primera División season as River Plate lost 4–0 to Talleres; in the years prior to his first-team debut, Sibille featured for the club's U20 team - notably at the 2016 U-20 Copa Libertadores in Paraguay. He appeared three more times for them, before departing at the end of his contract in June 2020. On 6 October, Sibille moved to Spain with Valencia B. He made his Segunda División B debut on 17 October against Atzeneta.

In January 2021, after six appearances for their reserves, Sibille was promoted into Valencia's first-team for a Copa del Rey second round match away to Yeclano of Segunda División B. He was subsequently selected to start by manager Javi Gracia, with the defender playing the full duration of a 4–1 win on 7 January.

On 24 July 2021, Sibille was loaned to Primera División RFEF side CD Castellón for one year. On 18 June of the following year, he moved to fellow third tier side CD Atlético Baleares on a two-year contract.

Career statistics
.

References

External links

1998 births
Living people
Footballers from Buenos Aires
Argentine footballers
Association football defenders
Argentine expatriate footballers
Expatriate footballers in Spain
Argentine expatriate sportspeople in Spain
Argentine Primera División players
Primera Federación players
Segunda División B players
Club Atlético River Plate footballers
Valencia CF Mestalla footballers
Valencia CF players
CD Castellón footballers
CD Atlético Baleares footballers